Bethel Town is a settlement in Jamaica. It was the site of political riots in 1938 and is a former slave village.

References

Populated places in Westmoreland Parish